Arunachal East Lok Sabha constituency is one of the two Lok Sabha (lower house of the Indian Parliament) constituencies in Arunachal Pradesh state in northeastern India. This constituency covers the entire Upper Siang, East Siang, Dibang Valley, Lower Dibang Valley, Lohit, Anjaw, Changlang and Tirap districts.

Assembly segments
Presently, Arunachal East Lok Sabha constituency comprises the following 27 Assembly segments:

Members of Parliament

Election results

General election 2019

General elections 2014

General elections 2009

General elections 2004

See also
 Arunachal West (Lok Sabha constituency)
 List of Constituencies of the Lok Sabha

References

External links
Arunachal east lok sabha  constituency election 2019 date and schedule

Lok Sabha constituencies in Arunachal Pradesh